Akwafei Singzoh Ajeakwa (born July 13, 1992) is an American soccer player who currently plays for Los Angeles Force in the NISA.

Career
Ajeakwa played college soccer at both Los Angeles Harbor College and Chico State University.

While at college, Ajeakwa also appeared for Premier Development League side Ventura County Fusion.

After a brief stint playing in the English lower leagues with Biggleswade United, Ajeakwa returned to the United States when he signed with United Soccer League side Orange County Blues.

References

External links
 

1992 births
Living people
20th-century African-American people
21st-century African-American sportspeople
African-American soccer players
American expatriate soccer players
American expatriate sportspeople in England
American people of Cameroonian descent
American soccer players
Biggleswade United F.C. players
Chico State Wildcats men's soccer players
Colorado Springs Switchbacks FC players
Expatriate footballers in England
Orange County SC players
People from Gardena, California
Soccer players from California
Sportspeople from Los Angeles County, California
FC Tulsa players
USL Championship players
USL League Two players
Ventura County Fusion players
Association football forwards